The 1918 United States Senate election in Illinois took place on November 5, 1918.

Incumbent Democrat J. Hamilton Lewis lost reelection to Republican Medill McCormick.

Election information
The primaries and general election coincided with those for House and those for state elections. The primaries were held September 11, 1918.

This was the first election for this U.S. Senate seat to be held after the Seventeenth Amendment to the United States Constitution went into effect, and was therefore the first time that this seat faced a popular election.

Democratic primary

Candidates
James Hamilton Lewis, incumbent U.S. senator
James O. Monroe, attorney and perennial candidate 
James Traynor

Results

Republican primary

Candidates
Alfred E. Case
George Edmund Foss, U.S. congresman
Medill McCormick, U.S. congressman
Patrick H. O'Donnell
William Hale Thompson, mayor of Chicago

Results

Socialist primary

Candidates
William Bross Lloyd, attorney and activist

Results

General election

Candidates
John M. Francis (Socialist Labor)
J. Hamilton Lewis (Democrat), incumbent U.S. senator
William Bross Lloyd (Socialist), attorney and activist
Medill McCormick (Republican), U.S. congressman
Frank B. Vennum (Prohibition Party), activist, capitalist, philanthropist, and 1912 candidate for Illinois treasurer

Results

See also
1918 United States Senate elections

References

1918
Illinois
United States Senate
William Hale Thompson